Nguyễn Văn Thương (Huế 1919-2002) was a Vietnamese composer. He was a recipient of the Hồ Chí Minh Prize in 2000.

Works

Songs
 Bài ca trên núi
 Bình Trị Thiên khói lửa
 Bướm hoa
 Đêm đông
 Người đẹp vườn xuân
 Trên sông Hương
 Tổ quốc tôi chưa đẹp thế bao giờ
 Dân ta đánh giặc anh hùng
 Gửi Huế giải phóng
 Bài ca trong hang đá
 Dâng người tiếng hát mùa xuân

References 

People from Huế
Vietnamese composers
1919 births
2002 deaths
Ho Chi Minh Prize recipients